The Roman Catholic Archdiocese of Fuzhou is an archdiocese located in the city of Fuzhou in China.

History
 1680: Established as Apostolic Vicariate of Fujian from the Apostolic Vicariate of Cochin 
 October 3, 1883: Renamed as Apostolic Vicariate of Northern Fo-kien
 December 27, 1923: Renamed as Apostolic Vicariate of Fuzhou
 April 11, 1946: Promoted as Metropolitan Archdiocese of Fuzhou

Special churches
Former Cathedral:
澳尾巷玫瑰圣母堂  (The Aowei Church of Our Lady of Rosary)

Leadership
Vicars Apostolic of Fujian / Fo-kien 福建 (Roman Rite) 
 Bishop François Pallu, M.E.P. (April 15, 1680 – October 29, 1684)
 Bishop Charles Maigrot, M.E.P. (July 25, 1684 – 1709)
 Bishop St. Pedro Sans i Jordà, O.P. (January 3, 1732 – May 26, 1747)
 Bishop Eusebio Oscot, O.P. (October 1, 1737 – November 28, 1743)
 Bishop Francisco Pallás Faro, O.P. (July 11, 1753 – March 1778)
 Bishop José Calvo, O.P. (February 16, 1781 – October 15, 1812)
 Bishop Roque José Carpena Díaz, O.P. (October 15, 1812 – December 30, 1849)
 Bishop Miguel Calderón, O.P. (December 30, 1849 – February 14, 1883)

Vicars Apostolic of Northern Fo-kien 福建北境 (Roman Rite) 
 Bishop Salvador Masot y Gómez, O.P. (June 20, 1884 – March 17, 1911)

Vicars Apostolic of Fuzhou 福州 (Roman Rite) 
 Bishop Francisco Aguirre Murga, O.P. (December 13, 1911 – June 12, 1941)

Archbishops of Fuzhou (Roman rite)
Archbishop Theodore Labrador Fraile, O.P. (June 13, 1946 – May 6, 1980)
Archbishop John Er-shi Ye (葉而適) (February 2, 1984 – February 23, 1991)
Archbishop John Shu-dao Yang (楊樹道) (1995 – August 28, 2010)
Archbishop Peter Jia-shan Lin (林佳善) (August 28, 2010 – Present)

Suffragan dioceses
 Funing 福寧 
 Tingzhou 汀州
 Xiamen 廈門

Sources
 GCatholic.org
 Catholic Hierarchy

1680s establishments in China
Christianity in Fujian
Fuzhou
Religious organizations established in the 1680s
Roman Catholic dioceses and prelatures established in the 17th century
Roman Catholic dioceses in China